Colin Ainsley Sharp (5 September 1953 – 7 September 2009) was an English actor, biographer, percussionist and singer-songwriter, who was part of the Manchester music scene of the late 1970s and dedicated to arts in Newcastle upon Tyne.

Career
In the late 1970s, he joined post-punk band The Durutti Column as singer during the last months of 1978, replacing original vocalist Phil Rainford. The band featured Vini Reilly and Dave Rowbotham as guitarists and future Simply Red members Tony Bowers on bass and Chris Joyce on drums. With him, the band continued to play live performances and recorded two songs, "No Communication" and "Thin Ice (Detail)", for the A Factory Sample EP (a various artist compilation which featured also other artists from Factory Records (label who signed the band): Joy Division, Cabaret Voltaire and John Dowie). Shortly afterwards, only Reilly remained in the band.

In 1978, by the time he joined and left The Durutti Column, he formed a glam-punk band, The Roaring 80s, who were active until their split in 1981, opening shows for Magazine, Joy Division and others.

In 1983, he founded, in Newcastle, the rock band SF Jive, which lasted until 1990; he was the band's vocalist and percussionist.

In 1988, he formed an experimental music trio called Glow, but they were active only one year.

In 2006, he reappeared in the post-punk scene, when his collaboration with American band Vernian Process was released within the band's second album The Forgotten Age.  It included the song "Where Are The Young Men?", which Sharp composed in memory of his late friends who were part of the new wave music scene, including Ian Curtis, Martin Hannett, Billy Mackenzie, Adrian Borland.

In 2007, he published his book Who Killed Martin Hannett? The History of Factory Records' Musical Magician, a biography of his close friend, the producer Martin Hannett.

He taught drama at Tyne Metropolitan College until July 2008.

Acting

Between 1979 and 2005, Sharp appeared in several television and film productions.

Death
Sharp died, age 56, after suffering a brain haemorrhage.

Bibliography

See also

 List of biographers
 List of English writers
 List of music artists and bands from Manchester
 List of people from Newcastle upon Tyne
 List of percussionists
 List of rock musicians
 List of singers

References

External links
 
 
 
Post-Punk.com - In Memoriam Colin Sharp on Tony Wilson
Facebook - Colin Sharp The Legend Tribute Facebook site

Place of birth missing
1953 births
2009 deaths
20th-century biographers
20th-century composers
20th-century British educators
20th-century English male actors
20th-century English singers
20th-century English writers

21st-century composers

21st-century English male actors
21st-century English singers
21st-century English writers
Male actors from Manchester
Male actors from Northumberland
British percussionists
Drama teachers
Education in the Metropolitan Borough of North Tyneside
English biographers
English experimental musicians
English male film actors
English male television actors
English punk rock singers
English male singer-songwriters
Founders
Musicians from Manchester
Musicians from Newcastle upon Tyne
Neurological disease deaths in England
British post-punk musicians
Writers from Manchester
The Durutti Column members
20th-century British male singers
21st-century British male singers
20th-century English male writers
Male biographers